Dominic Franklin "Mickey" Sanzotta (April 28, 1921 – January 21, 1999) was an American football player. He played college football at Western Reserve, now known as Case Western Reserve University, from 1939 to 1941 where he was co-captain with Paul Hudson his final season. A major collegiate career highlight was helping Western Reserve win its first and only bowl game in the 1941 Sun Bowl.  

Sanzotta played professional football in the National Football League (NFL) for the Detroit Lions in 1942 and 1946. He was the Lions' leading rusher in 1942 with 268 rushing yards on 71 carries. He missed the 1943 to 1945 seasons while serving in the Navy during World War II. He played for the Naval Air Technical Training Center Raiders football team in 1943.

References

1921 births
1999 deaths
American football running backs
Case Western Spartans football players
Detroit Lions players
People from Geneva, Ohio
Players of American football from Ohio